Sairin bin Karno is a Malaysian politician from BERSATU. He was the Member of Sabah State Legislative Assembly for Liawan from 2004 to 2018 and a Member of Dewan Negara from 1995 to 1999. He was also a former Sabah Assistant Minister.

Career 
He was a teacher from 1975 to 1981. Besides that, he was also the Chairman of Sabah MNI Agency from 1984 to 1995, member of Board of Director of FELCRA from 1993 to 1995, Director of the People's Development Leaders Unit from 1995 to 1996, Deputy Executive Chairman of the Sabah National Integration Unit in 1996, member of the board of directors of Tabung Haji Malaysia, President of the Sabah Native Affairs Council from 1998 to 2004. He is now the Chairman of the Sabah Islamic Welfare Organization.

Politics 
He started his political career in early 1980s and was a member of USNO. He joined UMNO after USNO was abolished. He was the Sabah Assistant Minister of Rural Development from 2008 to 2013, and Sabah Assistant Minister of Agriculture and Food Industry from 2013 to 2018. He quitted UMNO and joined BERSATU in 2019.

Election results

Honours 
  :
   Member of the Order of the Defender of the Realm (AMN) (1993)
  Officer of the Order of the Defender of the Realm (KMN) (1999)
  :
  Commander of the Order of Kinabalu (PGDK) – Datuk (1997)
  :
  Companion Class I of the Order of Malacca (DMSM) – Datuk (2002)

References 

Malaysian politicians
20th-century Malaysian politicians
21st-century Malaysian politicians
Malaysian Muslims
People from Sabah
United Malays National Organisation politicians
Malaysian United Indigenous Party politicians
Members of the Dewan Negara
Members of the Sabah State Legislative Assembly
Malaysian people of Malay descent
Living people
1954 births
Commanders of the Order of Kinabalu
Members of the Order of the Defender of the Realm
Officers of the Order of the Defender of the Realm